Graham Dunscombe (7 July 1924 – 13 September 2020) was an Australian rules footballer who played for North Melbourne in the Victorian Football League (VFL).

Family
The son of Charles Ernest Kingsman Dunscombe (1891–1978), and Rose Susannah Dunscombe (1892–1984), née Graham, Graham Dunscombe was born at Thornbury, Victoria on 7 July 1924.

He married Phyllis Ida "Peggy" Stewart in 1954, and they had two children, Roger, and Pamela.

Military service
Prior to his football career, Dunscombe served in Papua New Guinea with the Australian Army during World War II.

Football
Originally from Victorian Football Association (VFA) club Sandringham, Dunscombe made five appearances for North Melbourne in the 1947 VFL season before returning to the VFA.

He coached Moorabbin to the VFA premiership in 1963, after replacing Bob Wilkie as coach mid-season. From 1965 to 1967, Dunscombe coached VFA club Prahran, taking them to a Division 2 premiership in 1966; then from 1968 to 1968 coached the VFA's Mordialloc.

Footnotes

References
 Holmesby, Russell and Main, Jim (2007). The Encyclopedia of AFL Footballers. 7th ed. Melbourne: Bas Publishing.
 World War Two Nominal Roll: Private Graham Dunscombe (VX140654), Department of Veterans' Affairs.
 World War Two Service Record: Private Graham Dunscombe (VX140654), National Archives of Australia.

External links
 
 
 Graham Dunscombe, at The VFA Project.

1924 births
2020 deaths
Australian rules footballers from Melbourne
Moorabbin Football Club coaches
Moorabbin Football Club players
Mordialloc Football Club coaches
North Melbourne Football Club players
Prahran Football Club coaches
Sandringham Football Club players
People from Thornbury, Victoria
Australian Army personnel of World War II
Military personnel from Melbourne